Otwayia is a genus of flies belonging to the family Lesser Dung flies.

Species
O. sabina Richards, 1973

References

Sphaeroceridae
Diptera of Australasia
Brachycera genera